On 1 May 1944, 200 Greek communists ("The 200 of Kaisariani") were executed at the firing range of the Athens suburb of Kaisariani by the Nazi occupation authorities as reprisal for the killing of a German general by Greek Resistance forces.

Background
Greece had been under the dictatorial and fiercely anti-communist Metaxas Regime since 1936. Members of the Communist Party of Greece were persecuted and put in prison, chiefly in the Akronauplia and Corfu prisons, or sent to internal exile in small islands. With the German invasion of Greece and the start of the Axis Occupation of Greece in April 1941, the communist prisoners were placed under German control. Following the Italian surrender in September 1943, most of the communist prisoners, formerly held in the Italian-run Larissa concentration camp, were moved to Haidari concentration camp in the northwestern suburbs of Athens.

Executions

On 27 April 1944, ELAS partisans ambushed and killed the German general Franz Krech and three other German officers at Molaoi in Laconia. As a retaliation, the German occupation authorities announced via proclamation the execution of 200 communists on 1 May, as well as the execution of all males found by the German troops outside their villages on the Sparti–Molaoi road. In addition, the German proclamation reported that "under the impression of this crime, Greek volunteers on their own initiative killed a further 100 communists".

On 30 April, the news of the impending executions spread in the Haidari camp. Camp commandant Fischer called the workshop foremen, all former Akronauplia inmates, and asked which of the other prisoners could replace them, ostensibly as they would be moved to a different camp the next day, along with the inmates of the Chalkis prison. Interpreting this "move" as a cover for their execution, all Akronauplia prisoners said their goodbyes to their comrades, and an impromptu farewell party was held in cell block 3 of the camp.
 On the next morning, the Chalkis inmates were moved from the camp on trucks. Camp commandant Fischer then held a roll call and selected the 200 prisoners to be executed—almost all the former Akronauplia inmates (ca. 170), the former exiles in Anafi and a few who were imprisoned by the Germans. According to eyewitness accounts, the prisoners reacted with defiance, singing the Greek national anthem, the Dance of Zalongo song, and the song of the Akronauplia prisoners, even as the trucks arrived to take them off.

The 200 prisoners were brought to the Kaisariani rifle range, where they were executed in batches of twenty. The corpses were buried in the 3rd Athens Cemetery. Among the executed were  Napoleon Soukatzidis and Stelios Sklavainas (known for the Sophoulis-Sklavainas pact agreement before the war).

Commemoration

The executions were a seminal event of the Greek Resistance against the Axis forces, and resonate among the Greek Left to this day.

When on 1 May 1950 the celebration of the International Workers' Day was permitted for the first time since 1936 (the Metaxas Regime abolished it soon after), it was held at the Kaisariani shooting range. The crowd demanded amnesty for political offenses and the release of the over 20,000 political prisoners still held on the island Makronisos and elsewhere following the Greek Civil War.

On his June 1987 visit to Greece, German President Richard von Weizsäcker chose the Kaisariani Memorial to commemorate the victims of World War II occupation in a move regarded with scepticism by conservative circles of both the Greek and German administrations. While there, Weizsäcker also mentioned the names of some other places in Greece where the German Wehrmacht had perpetrated massacres: Kalavryta, Distomo, Kleisoura, Kommeno, Lyngiades, and Kandanos.

On 26 January 2015, the newly elected Prime Minister of Greece, Alexis Tsipras, the country's first leftist head of government, visited the shooting range and laid roses on the memorial to the executions, as his first act after being sworn in. The move was widely interpreted as a symbolic gesture of defiance towards Germany and its role in the Greek government-debt crisis.

In October 2017, the movie To Teleftaio Simeioma ("The Last Note") by the acclaimed Greek director Pantelis Voulgaris, was released. It focuses on the story of the 200, with the German camp commandant, SS captain Karl Fischer (André Hennicke) and the Greek political prisoner and interpreter Napoleon Soukatzidis (Andreas Konstantinou) as the main characters.

References

1944 in Greece
Conflicts in 1944
Mass murder in 1944
Nazi war crimes in Greece
Massacres in Greece during World War II
Massacres of men
Violence against men in Europe
Anti-communism in Greece
Athens in World War II
May 1944 events
People executed by Nazi Germany by firing squad
Greek people executed by Nazi Germany